Lene Skov Andersson (born 17 July 1968) is a Danish rower.
Along with Berit Christoffersen she finished 5th in the women's lightweight double sculls at the 1996 Summer Olympics.

References

External links
 
 

1968 births
Living people
Danish female rowers
Olympic rowers of Denmark
Rowers at the 1996 Summer Olympics
World Rowing Championships medalists for Denmark